Chup Tazia or silent tazia is the name given to religious processions held mostly on 8th of Rabi' al-awwal by Twelver Shia Muslims in India and Pakistan to commemorate the death of  Imam Hasan al-Askari, the eleventh of the Twelver Shi'a Imams. The procession is usually regarded as the last procession of the mourning period that begins in the Islamic month of Muharram.

Origin in Lucknow
The procession under the name of Chup Tazia have originated in the Indian city of Lucknow before spreading to other parts of South Asia. The procession dates back to nawabi era and was started by Nawab Ahmed Ali Khan Shaukat Yar Jung a descendant of Bahu Begum. It is one of the most important processions of azadari in Lucknow and is currently one of the nine allowed processions.  During nineteenth century this procession of Nawab Aggan Mian's family which earlier was raised on the day of Chehlum (20th Safar) was shifted to eighteenth day of Chehlum i.e. 8th of Rabi' al-awwal. This last mourning procession taken out on the morning of 8th of Rabi' al-awwal, includes alam, zari and tazia, originates from Imambara Nazim Saheb in Victoria street and moves in complete silence while passes through Patanala until it terminates at Karbala Kazmain, where the colossal black tazia is buried. On 26 May 1969, after a series of fairly serious clashes and murders, another riot broke out when a Shia Alam and Chup Tazia procession which had passed through the predominantly Sunni mohallas of Pul Ghulam and Mahmoodnagar almost peacefully was suddenly brick-batted from a Sunni mosque as the procession reached Mahmoodnagar.

Allahabad
There are two Chup Tazia processions in Allahabad,
 The first procession of Anjuman-e-Haideriya starts from Imambara Mirza Naqi Beg in Rani Mandi and passes through Bachchaji Ki Kothi, Kotwali, Khuldabad and terminates at Karbala.
 The second procession of Dasta-e-Abbasia starts from Imam Raza Masjid or Imambara Laddan Khan in Daryabad and culminates at Pathanwali Imambara Arab Ali Khan.

Hyderabad, India
In Hyderabad (India) the procession starts from Dabeerpura Flyover and reaches Alawa-e-Sartouq Mubarak at Darushafa which is a Shia Majority area in Hyderabad just before evening prayers (maghrib prayers). At this place a short majlis is arranged and after this majlis the black flags which symbolise sorrow are removed and red flags are hoisted which symbolise the joy. This changing of flags takes place as the next day, the ninth of Rabi al awwal, is festival day (Eid e Zehra s.w.a).

Karachi
Chup Tazia began in Pakistan after the independence of Pakistan in 1947. Mr. Nawab Hassan Lucknowi is founder Chup Tazia in Karachi, Pakistan. After his death, his son continues his mission. Now Mr. Imtiaz Hussain has led the Chup Tazia procession in Nishtar Park, Karachi. There are two Chup Tazia processions in Karachi:
First procession starts after the Fajr prayer from Nishtar Park in Soldier Bazar and culminates at Imambargah Hussainia Irania in Kharadar after the Zohrain prayers.
Second procession starts from Qasr-e-Musayyab in Rizvia Society and culminates at Masjid-o-Imambargah Shah-e-Najaf on Martin Road.

Kamoke-Gujranwala
Chup Tazia began in Pakistan after the independence of Pakistan in 1947. In 1998, Syed Ali Abbas Naqvi started Chup Tazia juloos in Kamoke-Gujranwala, Pakistan. In Kamoke, on 8 Rabi-al-Awal Chup Tazia jaloos/majlis is held at Nagri Abbas Shah and after majlis jaloos starts and via G.T.Road ends at Azakhana Talib Hussain Farooqi/Dr. Shahid Farooqi at 6:00 pm.

Alipur Chatha (Akalghar)
Chup Tazia jaloos started in Alipur Chatha (Akalghar) District Gujranwala by Dr. Syed Ali Akthar in 1948 when he migrated from Sadhaura District Ambala (now District Yumnanagar) India in continuity of historical  Chup Tazia from Sadhura. Chup Tazia majalish starts on 6th of Rabi ul Awal, Ghawara of Hazrat Ali Asghar AS is taken out after majlish on 7th Rabi ul Awal. On 8th of Rabi ul Awal Chup Tazia procession starts in the morning from Imam Bargah Darbar e Hussain and makes its way to Imam Bargah Sadat through city. Renowned speakers make speeches throughout the day. Azadaran e Imam Hussain AS perform matam from Haideri chowk to Imam Bargah Sadat.

References

Shia days of remembrance
Shia Islam in India
Islamic terminology